Evan Shawntell Oglesby (born December 18, 1981, in Toccoa, Georgia) is a former American football cornerback in the National Football League for the Buffalo Bills, Baltimore Ravens, Dallas Cowboys and Miami Dolphins. He was signed by the Buffalo Bills as an undrafted free agent in 2005. He played college football at the University of North Alabama.

Early years
Oglesby attended Stephens County High School, where he practiced football and basketball. He had one game where he caught 3 touchdowns. He blocked 24 kicks in his high school career.

He accepted a football scholarship from the NCAA Division II University of North Alabama. As a freshman, he started all 10 games at cornerback, registering 57 tackles, 4 interceptions, 2 forced fumbles, one blocked kick and 13 kickoff returns for 335 yards (25.8 avg.).

As a sophomore, he started in 7 games, making 56 tackles and one interception.

As a junior, he collected 66 tackles (fourth on the team), 2 tackles for loss, 7 interceptions (2 returned for touchdowns), 15 passes defensed, one forced fumble and one fumble recovery. He contributed to the team having a 13–1 record, that included the first perfect 11-0 regular-season in school history, a Gulf South Conference championship and reaching the semifinals of the NCAA Division II playoffs.

As a senior, he tallied 45 tackles (one for loss), one interception, 11 passes defensed and one blocked kick. He played in the Cactus Bowl Division II All-Star Game. He finished his college career as a four-year starter, with 224 tackles (11 for loss), 13 interceptions and 38 passes defensed.

In 2015, he was inducted into the University of North Alabama Athletic Hall of Fame.

Professional career

Buffalo Bills
Oglesby was signed as an undrafted free agent by the Buffalo Bills after the 2005 NFL Draft on April 29. He was waived on September 3 and re-signed to the team's practice squad on September 5. He was released on October 12.

Baltimore Ravens (first stint)
On December 6, 2005, Oglesby signed with the Baltimore Ravens. He appeared in the last 3 games and had 2 special teams tackles.

In 2006, he appeared 16 games as the third cornerback, making 9 defensive tackles, 2 passes defended and 17 special teams tackles (third on the team). He was cut on September 2, 2007.

Dallas Cowboys
On September 2, 2007, he was claimed off waivers by the Dallas Cowboys. He appeared in 8 games, posting 2 defensive tackles and 3 special teams tackles.

On March 17, 2008, Oglesby re-signed with the Cowboys as an exclusive-rights free agent. He was cut on September 2, 2008.

Baltimore Ravens (second stint)
On September 4, 2008, Oglesby was signed as a free agent by the Baltimore Ravens. He had 14 tackles. Though he was non-tendered as a restricted free agent in the 2009 offseason, he was re-signed by the Ravens on March 2. He was released on September 5.

Miami Dolphins
On November 24, 2009, he was signed by the Miami Dolphins. He was waived on November 28. He was re-signed on December 10, after Lydon Murtha was placed on the injured reserve list. He was cut to make room for Nate Ness on November 3, 2010.

References

External links

North Alabama Lions bio

1981 births
Living people
People from Toccoa, Georgia
Players of American football from Georgia (U.S. state)
American football cornerbacks
North Alabama Lions football players
Buffalo Bills players
Baltimore Ravens players
Dallas Cowboys players
Miami Dolphins players